B79 or B-79 may refer to:
 Bundesstraße 79, a German road
 Sicilian Defense, Dragon Variation, according to the Encyclopaedia of Chess Openings
 Silver City Highway, in New South Wales, Australia, designated B79
 Tamworth in the list of postal districts in the United Kingdom